Elaine  Yan-ling (born 15 December 1954), also known as Elaine Kam, is a Hong Kong–Taiwanese actress.

She began her career in Taiwan in 1973 before moving to Hong Kong in 1981.

She has been nominated seven times in the Hong Kong Film Awards and won three for her supporting roles in Love Unto Waste (1986), People's Hero (1987) and Port of Call (2016). In 1994, Jin earned her first Golden Horse Film Award, also in the supporting category, for her performance in Edward Yang's A Confucian Confusion (1994).

Jin won the Golden Horse Award and the Hong Kong Film Award for Best Supporting Actress for her performance in the 2016 film Mad World.

Personal life
Jin has been married twice, to Liang Tingbin (梁廷斌) in 1975 (divorced in 1981) and then with Robert Wong in 1989 (divorced in 2005).

Filmography

Film

TV series

References

External links
 
 HK Cinemagic entry

1954 births
Living people
Hong Kong people of Taiwanese descent
Place of birth missing (living people)
Hong Kong film actresses
Taiwanese film actresses
Taiwanese television actresses
TVB actors
20th-century Taiwanese actresses
21st-century Taiwanese actresses
20th-century Hong Kong actresses
21st-century Hong Kong actresses
Taiwanese lesbian actresses